The World Orthography (WO) is an alphabet and transcription system based on the Africa Alphabet and the International Phonetic Alphabet. In Daniel Jones’s 1948 Difference between Spoken and Written Language, an adaptation of WO for English is given with the letters a b c d ð e ə f g h i j k l m n ŋ o p r s ʃ t θ u v w x y z ʒ. The capitals of ð, ə, ŋ, ʃ, θ, and ʒ are: Ð (shaped like Ƌ), Ə, Ŋ (shaped like large ŋ), Ʃ (shaped like sigma Σ), Θ, and straight-bottomed Ʒ (shaped like reversed sigma).

Examples
English sample from Jones 1948:

Sinhala sample, The North Wind and the Sun, from Perera and Jones 1938:

See also
Africa alphabet
Latin-script alphabet
International Phonetic Alphabet
Standard Alphabet by Lepsius

Notes

References
 Firth, J. R. 1933. “Notes on the Transcription of Burmese”, Bulletin of the School of Oriental Studies, volume VII, part 1, January 1933, pp 137–140.
 Firth, J. R. 1936. “Alphabets and Phonology in India and Burma”, Bulletin of the School of Oriental Studies, volume VIII, part 2-3, January 1936, pp 517–546.
 Harley, Alexander Hamilton. 1944. Colloquial Hindustani. K. Paul, Trench, Trubner & co. ltd.
 Jones, Daniel. 1942. The problem of a national script for India. Hertford: Stephen Austin and Sons.
 Jones, Daniel. 1948. Differences between Spoken and Written Language.
 MacMahon, Michael K.C. 1991. “The International Phonetic Alphabet”, in Malmkjær, Kirsten (ed). The Linguistics encyclopedia. London: Routeledge.
 Perera, H. S. ; Jones, Daniel. 1938. “The Application of World Orthography to Sinhalese”, Bulletin of the School of Oriental Studies, volume IX, part 3, October 1938, pp 705–707.

Latin-script orthographies
Writing systems introduced in 1948